Radio comedy and drama was at its peak during the 1940s, and most of the films on this list were produced during that period. The list includes features, short subjects and serials.

United States
 The Aldrich Family
 What a Life (1939) 
 Life with Henry  (1941) 
 Henry Aldrich for President  (1941)  
 Henry Aldrich, Editor (1942) 
 Henry and Dizzy  (1942) 
 Henry Aldrich Swings It  (1943) 
 Henry Aldrich Gets Glamour (1943)  
 Henry Aldrich Haunts a House  (1943) 
 Henry Aldrich, Boy Scout (1944)
 Henry Aldrich Plays Cupid  (1944)  
 Henry Aldrich's Little Secret  (1944)
 Jack Benny
 Buck Benny Rides Again (1940)
 Big Town
 I Cover Big Town (1947)
 Big Town (1947)
 Big Town After Dark (1947)
 Big Town Scandal (1948)
 Breakfast in Hollywood (1946), based on radio's Breakfast in Hollywood
 Candid Microphone (1947), theatrical film shorts based on Allen Funt's Candid Microphone
 Captain Midnight (1942), serial based on radio's Captain Midnight
 Counterspy 
 David Harding, Counterspy (1950)
 Counterspy Meets Scotland Yard (1950)
 Crime Doctor
 Crime Doctor (1943)
 The Crime Doctor's Strangest Case (1943)
 Shadows in the Night (1944)
 Crime Doctor's Warning (1945)
 The Crime Doctor's Courage (1945)
 Just Before Dawn (1946)
 Crime Doctor's Man Hunt (1946)
 The Millerson Case (1947)
 The Crime Doctor's Gamble (1947)
 The Crime Doctor's Diary (1949)
 Dangerous Crossing (1953), based on radio's Cabin B-13
 A Date with Judy (1948), based on radio's A Date with Judy
 Dr. Christian
 Meet Dr. Christian (1939)
 Remedy for Riches (1940)
 The Courageous Dr. Christian (1940)
 Dr. Christian Meets the Women (1940)
 Melody for Three (1941)
 They Meet Again (1941)
 Duffy's Tavern (1945), based on Duffy's Tavern
 The Fat Man (1951), based on radio's The Fat Man
 Fibber McGee and Molly
 This Way Please (1937)
 Look Who's Laughing (1941)
 Here We Go Again (1942)
 Heavenly Days (1944)
 Gang Busters (1942), serial based on radio's Gang Busters
 The Great Gildersleeve, based on a character from Fibber McGee and Molly
 The Great Gildersleeve (1942)
 Gildersleeve on Broadway (1943)
 Gildersleeve's Bad Day (1943)
 Gildersleeve's Ghost (1944)
 The Goldbergs (1950), based on radio's The Goldbergs
 The Green Hornet
 The Green Hornet (1940), serial
 The Green Hornet Strikes Again! (1941), serial
 The Green Hornet (2006), short
 The Green Hornet (2011)
 Here Come the Nelsons (1952), based on The Adventures of Ozzie and Harriet
 Hollywood Hotel (1937), based on radio's Hollywood Hotel
 I Love a Mystery
 I Love a Mystery (1945)
 The Devil's Mask (1946)
 The Unknown (1946)
 Inner Sanctum Mystery
 Calling Dr. Death (1943)
 Weird Woman (1944)
 Dead Man's Eyes (1944)
 The Frozen Ghost (1945)
 Strange Confession (1945)
 Pillow of Death (1945)
 Inner Sanctum (1948)
 Jack Armstrong (1947), serial based on radio's Jack Armstrong, the All-American Boy
 Johnny Madero, Pier 23
 Danger Zone (1951)
 Roaring City (1951)
 Pier 23 (1951)
 The Life of Riley (1949), based on The Life of Riley
 The Lone Ranger
 The Lone Ranger (1938), serial
 The Lone Ranger Rides Again (1939), serial
 The Lone Ranger (1956) 
 The Lone Ranger and the Lost City of Gold (1958)
 The Legend of the Lone Ranger (1981)
 The Lone Ranger (2003), TV movie
 The Lone Ranger (2013)
 Lum and Abner
 Dreaming Out Loud (1940)
 The Bashful Bachelor (1942)
 Two Weeks to Live (1943)
 So This Is Washington (1943)
 Goin' to Town (1944)
 Partners in Time (1946)
 Lum and Abner Abroad (1956)
 Make Believe Ballroom (1949)
 Mr. District Attorney
 Mr. District Attorney (1941)
 Mr. District Attorney in the Carter Case (1941)
 Secrets of the Underground (1942)
 Mr. District Attorney (1947)
 My Friend Irma
 My Friend Irma (1949)
 My Friend Irma Goes West (1950)
 Myrt and Marge (1933), based on radio's Myrt and Marge
 People Are Funny (1946), based on radio's People Are Funny
 Pete Kelly's Blues (1955), based on radio's Pete Kelly's Blues
 Pot o' Gold (1941), based on radio's Pot o' Gold
 A Prairie Home Companion (2006), based on A Prairie Home Companion
 Queen for a Day (1951), based on radio's Queen for a Day
 Radio Stars on Parade (1945), based on radio's Truth or Consequences
 The Sea Hound (1947), serial based on radio's The Sea Hound
 The Shadow
 Shadow film shorts (1931–1932)
 The Shadow Strikes (1937)
 International Crime (1938)
 The Shadow (1940), serial
 The Shadow Returns (1946)
 Behind the Mask (1946)
 The Missing Lady (1946)
 Invisible Avenger (1958)
 The Shadow (1994)
 Sorry, Wrong Number (1948), based on an episode of Suspense written by Lucille Fletcher; starred Agnes Moorehead; between 1943 and 1957 the story was done live seven times; there was an eighth broadcast which was a repeat
 Take It or Leave It (1944)
 Way Back Home (1932)
 The Whistler
 The Whistler (1944)
 The Mark of the Whistler (1944)
 The Power of the Whistler (1945)
 Voice of the Whistler (1945)
 Mysterious Intruder (1946)
 The Secret of the Whistler (1946)
 The Thirteenth Hour (1947)
 The Return of the Whistler (1948)

United Kingdom
 The Adventures of PC 49
 The Adventures of PC 49 (1949)
 A Case for PC 49 (1951)
 Band Waggon (1940), based on Band Waggon
 The Black Widow (1951), based on Return from Darkness
 Celia (1949)
 Dick Barton
 Dick Barton: Special Agent (1948)
 Dick Barton Strikes Back (1949)
 Dick Barton at Bay (1950)
 Doctor Morelle (1949)
 Down Among the Z Men (1952) (aka Stand Easy; The Goon Movie; The Goon Show Movie), based on The Goon Show
 Hangman's Wharf (1950)
 Happidrome (1943), based on Happidrome
 Hi, Gang!, based on Hi, Gang!
 The Hitchhiker's Guide to the Galaxy (2005), based on the radio series of the same name by Douglas Adams
 It's That Man Again (1942), based on It's That Man Again
 The Lady Craved Excitement (1950)
 Life With The Lyons
 Life with the Lyons (1954)
 The Lyons in Paris (1955)
 The Man in Black (1949), based on Appointment with Fear
 Meet Simon Cherry (1949), based on Meet the Rev.
 The Navy Lark (1959), based on The Navy Lark
 Paul Temple
 Send for Paul Temple (1946)
 Calling Paul Temple (1948)
 Paul Temple's Triumph (1950)
 Paul Temple Returns (1952)
 Spaceways (1953)

Canada
 
  (1949)

Denmark
 Terkel in Trouble (2004)

France
 
  (1939)
  (1956)
  (1981)

Italy
 La bisarca (1950)
 
  (1963)

Mexico
 Kalimán
 Kalimán, el hombre increíble (1972)
 Kalimán en el Siniestro Mundo de Humanón (1976)

Spain
  (1960)

Sweden
 
  (1957)
  (1959)
  (1940)
 Froggy Ball
 Kalle Stropp, Grodan Boll och deras vänner (1956) 
 Kalle Stropp och Grodan Boll räddar Hönan (1987) 
 Charlie Strapp and Froggy Ball Flying High (1991)
  (1961)
  (1954)
 
  (1956)
  (1957)
  (1958)
  (1959)
  (1957)
  (1950)
 Sune
 Sune's Summer (1993)
 Sunes familie (1997)
 The Anderssons in Greece (2012)
 The Anderssons Hit the Road (2013)
 The Anderssons Rock the Mountains (2014)

West Germany
 Hello, My Name is Cox (1955)
 Die Hesselbachs
 Die Familie Hesselbach (1954)
 Familie Hesselbach im Urlaub (1955)
 Das Horoskop der Familie Hesselbach (1956)
 Herr Hesselbach und die Firma (1956)

Philippines
 Love Notes: The Movie (1995)

See also
 Lists of movie source material
 List of films based on comics
 List of films based on comic strips
 List of films based on television programs
 List of U.S. radio programs

References

 
Radio series
Radio-related lists